George Nassau Clavering-Cowper, 3rd Earl Cowper (1738 – 22 December 1789) was an English peer who went on the Grand Tour as a young man, but actually emigrated. Despite becoming a member of parliament and later inheriting lands and the title of Earl Cowper in England, he remained in Italy. He amassed a valuable art collection and became a Prince of the Holy Roman Empire. He was a patron of the arts and science.

Biography
George Nassau Clavering-Cowper was the son of the 2nd Earl Cowper and the godson of George II. He was educated at Eton College. His education was planned to be completed with a Grand Tour. This rite of passage for British aristocrats required that they tour the continent in the company of a tutor.

Clavering-Cowper was at the time known as Viscount Fordwich. Accompanied by his tutor, they travelled through France, the Netherlands, and Germany before Clavering-Cowper studied for two years in Switzerland. Unlike other Grand Tourers, Fordwich was independent of his parents as he had inherited a fortune from his maternal grandfather in 1754. The tourers arrived in Florence on 7 July 1759.

Fordwich's father was expectant of his return; he arranged for him to be elected as the Member of Parliament for Hertford in December 1759. However, Fordwich was establishing himself in Florentine society. By the following year his tutor, Jean Chastellain, asked for and was given permission to abandon his charge. The 2nd Earl gave Chastellain leave to return to his home town of Vevey.

Florence

He married the sixteen-year-old Hannah Anne Gore, daughter of Charles Gore, on 2 June 1775. Their betrothal was commemorated with a painting by Zoffany commissioned by Fordwich's new father-in-law. In 1780, he bought the Villa Palmieri in Fiesole which overlooks Florence. They had three children; the first two would become the 4th and 5th Earl Cowper.

Although George Nassau Cowper had left his family's seats and his father in England he was not without connections. He had ambitions to be the British representative in Florence and he tried to increase his favour with the King. He sent a small painting to the King and also sent further copies of Italian works to England. The job he wanted was held by Sir Horace Mann who despite not being as much in favour as Cowper, was still the British Resident in Florence. Cowper was successful in other ways. He was instrumental in having a monument erected on Machiavelli's tomb, in the Church of Santa Croce.

Cowper was able to get himself made a Prince of the Holy Roman Empire. His title was Prince of Nassau d'Auverquerque (his mother had been born "Henrietta Nassau d'Auverquerque") and he was given permission by George III to adopt this title.

Cowper only returned to England once, and this was only a brief visit after over thirty years' absence. His arrival was so remarkable that it was reported on by Horace Walpole. In a letter to Sir Horace Mann he recounts that he was astounded to see
an English Earl who is more proud of a Pinchbeck Principality and a paltry order from Württemberg than he was of being a peer of Great Britain when Great Britain was something.

Art collection
 
Cowper's art collection absorbed a great deal of his time and money. Among his most notable possessions are two paintings by Raphael. The first is known as the Small Cowper Madonna and the other is the Niccolini-Cowper Madonna. The latter is particularly remarkable in that he can be seen evaluating the painting in another painting. [[Tribuna of the Uffizi (painting)|Tribuna of the Uffizi'+]] shows Cowper looking at the painting as it is offered by Johann Zoffany. Zoffany had purchased the painting from the Niccolini family in 1782 and sold it to Cowper in 1785.

Zoffany was in Italy on a mission by the British royal family to paint the Tribuna. Zoffany lost his role as a court painter due to including figures in this commission. Reputedly Cowper was thought acceptable but the others were considered unnecessary.

Cowper used Zoffany's expertise to increase the value of his art collection in addition to giving him commissions. Zoffany painted Cowper and his fiancée separately as well as including both of them in the painting commissioned by his father-in-law, Charles Gore.  Artists Cowper collected included Giuseppe Antonio Fabrini, the landscape artist Francesco Zuccarelli, Jakob Philipp Hackert, and Hugh Primrose Dean. After 1778, Cowper purchased Fra Bartolommeo's Holy Family'' in 1779 and he also supported Joseph Plura, Innocenzo Spinazzi, Hugh Douglas Hamilton, and Jacob More.

Patron
Cowper's support was not limited to artists. His cousin William Cowper, a noted poet, received a generous annuity from him. Count Volta also received a complete laboratory from Cowper and they also had continued correspondence as Cowper assisted Volta with translation for a paper presented to the Royal Society.

Death and legacy
Cowper died on 22 December 1789 at age 51 from dropsy. His body was returned to England and buried in Hertford. His title was taken by his eldest son, George Augustus. His second son, Peter Leopold Louis Francis Nassau, inherited that title in 1799 and held it for another 38 years, which denied the title to Cowper's last son, Edward Spencer.

Arms

References

1738 births
1789 deaths
People educated at Eton College
Princes of the Holy Roman Empire
Fellows of the Royal Society
British MPs 1754–1761
Members of the Parliament of Great Britain for English constituencies
Earls Cowper
George